Hanle can mean:

 Hanle (village), located in eastern Indian Ladakh, near the Chinese border
 The Indian Astronomical Observatory, adjacent to Hanle village, location of the highest major astronomical telescopes in the world and colloquially known as Hanle
 Hanle Valley, valley containing Hanle village, observatory and monastery 
 Hanle Monastery 
 Wilhelm Hanle, German physicist
 Hanle effect, a reduction in the polarisation of light caused by a magnetic field, named after Wilhelm Hanle
 Zack Hanle, American cookbook author

See also

 Hanley (disambiguation)